The State Register of Heritage Places is maintained by the Heritage Council of Western Australia. , 336 places are heritage-listed in the City of Bunbury, of which 46 are on the State Register of Heritage Places.

List
The Western Australian State Register of Heritage Places, lists the following 46 state registered places within the City of Bunbury:

Notes

 No coordinates specified by Inherit database

References

Bunbury
 
Bunbury